Dennis, Georgia may refer to:

Dennis, Murray County, Georgia, United States
Dennis, Putnam County, Georgia, United States